Oscar Taty Maritu (born 17 August 1999) is a Congolese professional footballer who plays for Chinese club Cangzhou Mighty Lions F.C. as a forward.

Club career

Yanbian Funde
On 11 July 2018, Yanbian FC officially signed Oscar. It was reported that Oscar had been training with Yanbian youth team since 2017. He had his debut goal on 18 July against Shijiazhaung Ever Bright. For the 2018 season, he scored 10 goals in 15 matches, saving Yanbian from the relegation area.

Shaanxi Chang'an Athletics
Upon Yanbian's bankruptcy shortly before the 2019 season, Oscar was released and joined Shaanxi Chang'an Athletics on a free transfer. He scored twice to help Shaanxi win their first League One match.

Shijiazhuang Ever Bright
On 17 February 2020, Oscar has signed a contract with the Chinese Super League newly-promoted club after a reported transfer fee of 15 million Chinese yuan (around 2.15 million U.S. dollars). He would make his debut for the club in a league game on 26 July 2020 against Hebei in a 2-2 draw. This would be followed by his first goal for the club on 1 August 2020 in a league game against Qingdao Huanghai in a 2-2 draw. With the step up in quality, Maritu would not be as prolific, this would be exasperated when on 4 December 2022 after being awarded a penalty he decided to feint the ball, resulting in a foul against him as Cangzhou ultimately lost the game 4-0.

Career statistics

Club
.

References

External links
 

1999 births
Living people
Association football forwards
Democratic Republic of the Congo footballers
Expatriate footballers in China
Democratic Republic of the Congo expatriate footballers
Democratic Republic of the Congo expatriate sportspeople in China
China League One players
Chinese Super League players
Yanbian Funde F.C. players
Shaanxi Chang'an Athletic F.C. players
Cangzhou Mighty Lions F.C. players